The Listening is a 2006 Italian crime drama film directed by Giacomo Martelli in his debut. The film is based on the mass surveillance operations conducted by the National Security Agency (NSA) with the aid of private corporations, and explores the dire consequences that can arise due to excessive corporate influence on a government agency set up for mass surveillance.

Plot
In the late 1990s, the National Security Agency (NSA) and a computer software firm, Wendell Crenshaw work together to implement a surveillance technology, the Echelon, which enables NSA to monitor almost anybody in the world. When classified information about the Echelon system accidentally finds its way into a young woman's hands, a terrible clash occurs in the opinions of a top-executive at Wendell Crenshaw  and an NSA operative, the former determined to find out what the lady knows even if it means using violence and the latter, equally determined to save an innocent woman's life.

ECHELON 
Making a film specifically on ECHELON offered the possibility of exploring the issues of interception, violation of privacy, and the interference of corporate interests in matters of national as well as international security simultaneously.

Cast and Crew
 Michael Parks : James Wagley
 Maya Sansa : Francesca Savelli
 Andrea Tidona : Gianni Longardo
 James Parks : Anthony Ashe
  Matt Patresi : Guglia Graef
 Bruce McGuire : Phil Kovacs
 Vincent Riotta : Frank Vaughan
 Terence Beesley : John Strobel
 Carla Cassola : Tina Longardo
Giulia Bernardini : Katherine Palmer
 Marc Fiorini : Lehmann  
 Adam O'Neill : Louis Perry

Awards
Taormina International Film Festival 2006
 Best Story - Giacomo Martelli

Viareggio EuropaCinema
 Best Actress - Maya Sansa

See also

List of films featuring surveillance

References

External links
 

2006 films
2006 crime drama films
2006 directorial debut films
Italian crime drama films
2000s Italian-language films
Films about security and surveillance
Films about mass surveillance
Films about the National Security Agency
2000s Italian films